Henk Wery (born 10 June 1943) is a Dutch former footballer who played for Feyenoord and was part of their European Cup victory in 1970. He earned 12 caps and scored 3 goals for the Netherlands national football team.

References

1943 births
Dutch footballers
Eredivisie players
AFC DWS players
FC Utrecht players
Feyenoord players
Living people
Netherlands international footballers
Sportspeople from Amersfoort
UEFA Champions League winning players
UEFA Cup winning players
Association football forwards
Footballers from Utrecht (province)